The Renault Samsung SM3 is a compact car produced by the South Korean manufacturer Renault Samsung Motors from 2003 to 2020.


First generation (G10; 2002–2009)

The first generation SM3 was a rebranded first generation Nissan Sunny/Bluebird Sylphy made in South Korea by Renault Samsung Motors. Production began in September 2002 in Busan.

It has four versions and two four-cylinder engines available: the 1.5 litre QG15DE and the 1.6 litre with CVTC system QG16DE petrol, both from Nissan.

In 2006, the SM3 was launched as Nissan Almera Classic in Ukraine and Russia. The same year, the car was launched in Central and South America as Nissan Almera, (Except in Chile where it was sold as Samsung), replacing Sentra after this became a large family car.

The SM3 was also sold as the Nissan Sunny in the Middle East and as the Renault Scala in Mexico, Egypt and Colombia.

In July 2009, it was renamed as SM3 CE (Classic Edition). The company announced production of the first generation SM3 would be continued while demand existed. The SM3 CE was discontinued in 2011 in Korea and was manufactured in Busan for the Russian, and Peru Market, under the Nissan brand. Production ended in 2013.

Gallery

Second generation (L38; 2009–2020)

In April 2009, a redesigned SM3 was unveiled at the Seoul Motor Show.

The second-generation SM3 is essentially a notchback saloon version of the Mégane 3 with minor cosmetic changes, also badged as Renault Fluence.

In 2019, Renault Samsung ceased production of the internal combustion engined SM3.

2012 facelift
In October 2012, Renault Samsung Motors introduced a redesigned front end for the 2013 model year of the SM3, with a new grille, headlamps and bumper as well as an improved equipment.

SM3 Neo
To create a "family feeling" with a new model of the company, the QM3 imported from Europe, Renault Samsung Motors introduced a new facelift to the SM3's front-end for the 2015 model year, known as the SM3 Neo.

Gallery

SM3 Z.E.

At the 2011 Seoul Motor Show, Renault Samsung Motors unveiled an all-electric variant of the SM3 called the Z.E. It is based on the Renault Fluence Z.E. and is partly financed by the South Korean Government. The car entered into mass production at the Busan factory during October 2013. The company targets a production of about 4,000 units per year. In 2013, its second marketing year and the first of South Korean assembly, the SM3 Z.E. was leader in electric vehicle sales, with a market share of 58% and 453 cars sold. The company attributed this to its AC-3 charger, its greater range compared to rivals and a better warranty for the battery.

In November 2017, company introduced new SM3 Z.E. with range increased by 57 percent to 213 kilometers (132.3 miles) based on the Korean type approval cycle.

References

External links

 (SM3 Z.E.)

SM3
Compact cars
Sedans
Front-wheel-drive vehicles
Cars introduced in 2009